Jessie J. Govan (born July 25, 1997) is an American professional basketball player. He also played college basketball for the Georgetown Hoyas.

High school career
Govan attended St. Mary's High School before transferring to Wings Academy, playing under coach Billy Turnage. As a senior, Govan led Wings to the Bronx borough championship and PSAL Championship game. He was a McDonald's All American nominee.  Rated 44th in his class by Scout.com, Govan signed with Georgetown over offers from UConn, Stanford, Seton Hall, NC State, Syracuse and Miami (Fla.).

College career
Govan was named to the Big East All-Freshman Team and averaged 6.8 points and 4.1 rebounds per game. As a sophomore, Govan averaged 10.1 points and 5.0 rebounds per game. Govan averaged 17.9 points and 10 rebounds per game as a junior. He declared for the 2018 NBA draft, but ultimately decided to return to Georgetown. On January 11, 2019, Govan scored a career-high 33 points along with 14 rebounds in a 96–90 double overtime win over Providence. Govan was named to the First Team All-Big East in his senior season. As a senior, Govan averaged 17.5 points and 7.5 rebounds per game, shooting 41.2 percent on three-pointers. He participated in the Reese's NABC College All-Star Game and Portsmouth Invitational Tournament. He graduated from Georgetown with a degree in sociology.

Professional career
After going undrafted in the 2019 NBA draft, Govan played for the Toronto Raptors in the NBA Summer League. On August 7, 2019, Govan signed with the San-en NeoPhoenix of the Japanese league. He averaged 18.5 points, 8.7 rebounds and 3.2 assists per game with the NeoPhoenix. After parting ways with the team, Govan signed with Kyoto Hannaryz on December 10. He averaged 17 points and 11 rebounds per game for Kyoto. On July 16, 2020, Govan signed with Seoul Samsung Thunders of the Korean Basketball League.

On February 1, 2021, Govan signed with the NBA G League Ignite. On July 3, 2021, Govan signed with the Indios de Mayagüez of the Puerto Rican Baloncesto Superior Nacional. He averaged 16.3 points, 6.0 rebounds, and 1.3 assists per game. On October 2, 2021, Govan returned to the NBA G League Ignite.

On October 28, 2021, Govan re-signed with the NBA G League Ignite.

On October 25, 2022, he signed with the Meralco Bolts of the Philippine Basketball Association (PBA) to replace Johnny O'Bryant III as the team's import for the 2022–23 PBA Commissioner's Cup. However, he was deemed ineligible to play in the conference as he was measured above the 6'10" height limit.

In January 2023, Govan signed with the San Miguel Beermen as the team's import for the 2023 EASL Champions Week held in Japan.

References

External links
NBA G League profile
Georgetown Hoyas bio

1997 births
Living people
American expatriate basketball people in Japan
American expatriate basketball people in South Korea
American men's basketball players
Basketball players from New York City
Centers (basketball)
Georgetown Hoyas men's basketball players
Kyoto Hannaryz players
NBA G League Ignite players
San-en NeoPhoenix players
Sportspeople from Queens, New York
Indios de Mayagüez basketball players
Seoul Samsung Thunders players
San Miguel Beermen players
American expatriate basketball people in the Philippines